The 1996 season was the fifth full year of competitive football (soccer) in Estonia since gaining independence from the Soviet Union on 20 August 1991.

National Leagues

Meistriliiga

Esiliiga

Estonian FA Cup

Semifinals

Final

National Team

Notes

External links
1995–1996 season on RSSSF
RSSSF Historic Results
RSSSF National Team Results
RSSSF Baltic Cup 1996

 
Seasons in Estonian football